Parahexyl (Synhexyl, n-hexyl-Δ3-THC, (C6)-Δ6a(10a)-THC) is a synthetic homologue of THC which was invented in 1941 during attempts to elucidate the structure of Δ9-THC, one of the active components of cannabis.

Parahexyl produces effects typical of other cannabinoid receptor agonists in animals. It has a somewhat higher oral bioavailability than THC itself but is otherwise very similar. Presumably, it acts as a CB1 agonist in the same way as THC, but as there has been no research published using parahexyl since the discovery of the CB1 receptor, this has not been definitively confirmed.

Parahexyl was occasionally used as an anxiolytic in the mid-20th century, the dosage ranging from 5 mg to 90 mg.

Parahexyl was made illegal under UN convention in 1982 on the basis of its structural similarity and similar effects profile to THC. Parahexyl was placed into the most restrictive Schedule 1 as a compound with no medical use, despite the now-known medical uses for cannabinoids.

Isomerism
At least three isomers of parahexyl have been studied and are known to be active as cannabinoids. Parahexyl itself (i.e. the Δ6a(10a) isomer) has not had any significant use in scientific research since it was banned internationally in the early 1980s; however, the Δ8 and Δ9 isomers are both known to be cannabinoid receptor agonists, and Δ8-parahexyl has the code number JWH-124, while Δ9-parahexyl has been isolated from Cannabis plant material and assigned the name tetrahydrocannabihexol.

Note that 6H-dibenzo[b,d]pyran-1-ol is the same as 6H-benzo[c]chromen-1-ol.

See also 
 Delta-3-Tetrahydrocannabinol
 Tetrahydrocannabutol
 Tetrahydrocannabiphorol
 Tetrahydrocannabivarin

References 

Benzochromenes
Cannabinoids
Phenols